The 2010–11 Czech Women's First League was the 18th season of the Czech Republic's top-tier football league for women.

Standings
Sparta Praha won the championship. Teplice was relegated.

Relegation play-off
Eighth place Pardubice played a two-legged play-off against Slovan Liberec. Liberec had won the second league promotion play-off against Jihlava 6–0 on aggregate. Pardubice then won the relegation play-off 3–2 on aggregate and remained in the first division.

References

2010–11 domestic women's association football leagues
2010–11 in Czech football
Czech Women's First League seasons